Katinniq/Donaldson Airport  is located  east of Raglan Mine, Quebec, Canada.

Airlines and destinations

Cargo

References

External links

Registered aerodromes in Nord-du-Québec